Admir Seferagić (born 27 October 1994) is a Switzerland footballer who plays as a forward for FC Rotkreuz in the 5th tier 2. Liga Interregional.

Club career 

Admir Seferagić made his professional debut for Basel on 17 August 2013 in the Swiss Cup against BSC Old Boys. He replaced Stephan Andrist after 74 minutes in a 0-1 away win. Ivan Ivanov scored the only goal for FC Basel in overtime.  At the end of the 2013–14 Super League season he won the league championship with Basel. They also reached the final of the 2013–14 Swiss Cup, but were beaten 2–0 by Zürich after extra time. During the 2013–14 Champions League season Basel reached the group stage and finished the group in third position. Thus they qualified for Europa League knockout phase and here they advanced as far as the quarter-finals.

On 19 May 2014 Basel announced that Seferagić transferred to Schaffhausen. It was confirmed on 15 December 2016, that he was released by the club.

Ahead of the 2019/20 season, Seferagić joined SC Young Fellows Juventus. However, he left the club again after six games and two goals, and was announced as a new SC Cham player on 18 September 2019.

Honours

Club
Basel
 Swiss Super League: 2013–14
 Swiss Cup Runner-up: 2013–14

References

External links
 

1994 births
Living people
Swiss people of Bosnia and Herzegovina descent
Association football forwards
Association football wingers
Association football midfielders
Swiss men's footballers
FC Basel players
FC Schaffhausen players
SC Kriens players
SC Young Fellows Juventus players
SC Cham players
Swiss Super League players
Swiss Promotion League players
Swiss Challenge League players
2. Liga Interregional players